The National Alliance (NS) is a Lithuanian nationalist political party, established on 7 March 2020. The chairman is the philosopher Vytautas Radžvilas.

History
The Vilnius Forum was established on 9 January 2016, and in 2018, when forums in other cities appeared, it merged into the National Forum. It participated in the 2019 European Parliament elections as the Public Election Committee "Vytautas Radžvilas: Let's Get the State Back!", but did not win seats.

By 2020, member of Lithuanian Centre Party in Varėna district Martynas Katelynas joined National Alliance and by this the party gained first member in municipal council. In 2020 Lithuanian parliamentary election the party got 2.21 per cent of the votes in nationwide constituency and failed to win any of single-member constituencies. Due to this, the party is not represented on national level politics.

The National Alliance represents nationalist, socially conservative, pro-Christian views, and claims that it opposes the deepening of European Union integration, the strategy of "Global Lithuania".

Election results

European Parliament

Seimas

References

External links
Official website

Conservative parties in Lithuania
Nationalist parties in Lithuania